Mannheim is a city in Germany.

Mannheim or Manheim may also refer to:

Buildings
 Manheim (hof), a neopagan building in Denmark
 Mannheim (San Mar, Maryland), U.S., a historic home and grist mill
 Mannheim (Linville, Virginia), U.S., a historic home built in 1788
 Mannheim station (Illinois), a Metra commuter railroad station in Franklin Park, Illinois

Places
 Mannheim, Ontario, Canada
 Markham Village, Ontario, was known as Mannheim
 Manheim, New York, U.S.
 Manheim, Pennsylvania, U.S.
 Manheim Township, Lancaster County, Pennsylvania, U.S.
 Manheim, West Virginia, U.S., a neighborhood of the town of Rowlesburg
 Manheim, Germany, a subdivision of the town of Kerpen, in the  Rhein-Erft-Kreis district

Other uses
 Mannheim (electoral district), a constituency for the German Bundestag (parliament)
 Mannheim (surname)
 Manheim Auctions, a major wholesale automobile auction company
 Mannheim Road, a major north-south thoroughfare in the suburbs of Chicago, Illinois, U.S.
 Mannheim School District 83, Franklin Park, Illinois
 Mannheim Steamroller, an American Neoclassical new-age music group
 Mannheim Tornados, a baseball and softball club from Mannheim, Baden-Württemberg
 , a trawler requisitioned by the Kriegsmarine during World War II
 University of Mannheim, Mannheim, Baden-Württemberg, Germany
 VfR Mannheim, a German association football club based in Mannheim, Baden-Württemberg
 "(Weird) Manheim", a song by the band Mayhem on their 1987 EP Deathcrush

See also 
 Mannheim School, a school of classical music
 
 Midgard or Mannheimr, the home of men in Norse mythology
 Mannheimer